Medusa (Medusalith Amaquelin-Boltagon) is a character appearing in American comic books published by Marvel Comics. Created by Stan Lee and Jack Kirby, the character first appeared in Fantastic Four #36 (1965).

Her name and aspects of the character are derived from Greek mythology, as her hair has prehensile attributes like that of Medusa's hair. The character has psychokinetic control over her hair, a power she obtained through Terrigenesis. Due to this, she can expand her hair to double its normal length, use it to pick locks, remotely lift objects, and often contain objects and people.

Serinda Swan primarily portrayed Medusa in the 2017 Marvel Cinematic Universe (MCU) television series Inhumans.

Publication history

Medusa first appeared in Fantastic Four #36 (1965) and was created by Stan Lee and Jack Kirby. She appears first in a flashback, then in costume as part of the fledgling "Frightful Four". She appears in Fantastic Four #38, 41, 42, 43, 44-48 and in various subplot glimpses from #49-62. The Inhumans also appear in Fantastic Four # 82–83, with Medusa. They are granted their first new adventure in Fantastic Four Annual #5, and a solo series in the split-book Amazing Adventures #1-10. The first four installments are written and drawn by Jack Kirby. The second four installments are written by Roy Thomas and illustrated by Neal Adams. That storyline flows into the ongoing "Kree-Skrull War" in The Avengers title #94-97.

Medusa has also figured prominently in the twelve part maxi-series The Inhumans written by Paul Jenkins and illustrated by Jae Lee in the 1990s.

Medusa appears in the new series FF by Matt Fraction and Mike Allred, which debuted in November 2012.

Beginning in May 2015, Medusa appeared as one of the main characters in A-Force, an all-female Avengers spin-off being launched by G. Willow Wilson, Marguerite Bennett, and Jorge Molina during Marvel's Secret Wars crossover.

In 2017, Medusa appeared in an early adventure with the Frightful Four, published as The Avengers 1.1- 5.1. This five-issue mini-series is positioned between The Avengers #16 and #17 as a side story when the evil team thinks they have killed the Fantastic Four (in Fantastic Four #38), but no one knows it. The Frightful Four publicly attack Captain America and his new team of replacements after their press conference to earn some "street cred". They are defeated in a rematch in issue 4.1. Medusa presumably flees before the team's final cameo in 5.1, where they are preparing a grave for her as a "traitor".

Fictional character biography
Medusa belongs to the race of Inhumans, a species of prehistoric earthlings mutated by the Terrigen Mists produced deep under the Inhuman city-state of Attilan, presently located in the oxygen-rich Blue Area of the Moon. Medusa's younger sister is Crystal (who later became the wife of the Avenger Quicksilver). Considered a member of Attilan's Royal Family, Medusa's parents chose to expose her to the Terrigen Mists when she was a child.

During her adolescent years, Medusa would often visit her distant cousin Black Bolt during his confinement, and she learned to communicate with him through body language. During these visits, the two fell in love and became engaged. She attended Black Bolt's release from his isolation cell at the age of eighteen and witnessed the first confrontation between Black Bolt and his insane brother, Maximus the Mad. Maximus also claims to be in love with Medusa and has made frequent attempts to usurp both the throne of Attilan as well as his brother's bride-to-be. It was in Maximus' first successful attempt to take the throne that Medusa was knocked off a sky-sled by the Trikon and afflicted with amnesia. She left Attilan and wandered across Europe as a thief.

Still suffering from amnesia, Medusa joined the super-villain team the Frightful Four and battled the Fantastic Four on three separate occasions.

She was then pursued by Gorgon on behalf of Maximus. Eventually, Medusa regained her senses and rejoined forces with the Inhumans Royal Family on the run. She was reunited with Black Bolt who had been searching for her, and returned to Attilan. However, she became trapped in Atillan by the "negative zone" barrier created by Maximus. She was eventually freed from the barrier at great cost by Black Bolt, and left the Great Refuge to visit the outside world as an adventurer. It was some time before the disastrous effects of worldly pollution on the Inhumans were known. She engages Spider-Man in his title for an issue, being manipulated by the manufacturer/promoter of a line of shampoo products. She also has been re-abducted by the Frightful Four in an attempt to manipulate her. The Fantastic Four became friends and allies and aided the Inhumans on several occasions, such as during the frequent power struggles between Black Bolt and the deranged Maximus.

Medusa has been known to join the Fantastic Four as a full team member for brief periods. She became a temporary replacement for Susan Richards, known as the Invisible Girl at that time when on family leave, caring for her comatose son Franklin Richards. Through her relations with the Fantastic Four, Medusa and Black Bolt have sought to achieve an understanding and peace between the races of Earth and Attilan. Nevertheless, the Inhumans have been forced to relocate their home of Attilan several times due to continued human hostility.

Black Bolt would eventually become the king of the Inhumans upon the death of his parents. Medusa oversaw the moving of Attilan to the Blue Area of the Moon. Alongside the Inhuman Royal Family, she battled the Avengers under Maximus's mind control. Medusa and Black Bolt were then married and Medusa was made queen, becoming both royal consort and royal interpreter. When Medusa became pregnant, Attilan's Genetics Council argued that the pregnancy should be terminated due to the possibility of the child inheriting Maximus' insanity coupled with Black Bolt's immense and destructive power. Medusa defied the council and fled to Earth to avoid the compulsory abortion and live anonymously in the desert until the child was born, a son named Ahura. Black Bolt reconciled with Medusa and the pair returned to Attilan and turned their infant son over to the Genetics Council. Following these events, Ahura was not mentioned or seen in the Marvel Universe for several years.

Later, alongside the Inhumans and the original X-Factor, she battled Apocalypse. Alongside the Inhumans and Avengers, she also battled the Brethren.

Royalty
Medusa's primary role among the Inhumans is as interpreter for her liege and husband, the silent but commanding Black Bolt. As such she is an experienced state figure within the quasi-feudal system of the Inhumans' government, and is used to speaking with awareness of regal issues of protocol and comportment. This imperial attitude is usually tempered by her strong sense of morality and fairness.

Medusa is featured in the six issue series Beyond!. She is kidnapped along with other famous and infamous superhumans to the artificial planet known as Battleworld. Medusa witnessed Venom's killing of the Space Phantom disguised as Spider-Man, leading her to believe the real Spider-Man had been murdered. Medusa passes royal judgement that Venom must undergo fifty lashes. She supersedes the authority of the Avenger's representative, Janet Van Dyne, and uses the control over her hair to create a whipping motion so fast that it produces miniature sonic booms, which Venom is especially vulnerable to. While Hank Pym tries to dissuade Medusa from continuing the punishment, Venom is able to stab Medusa through the thigh. Later on in the issue, Medusa saves the team during the sudden crash landing of their space vessel by absorbing the majority of the impact with her hair. As stated by Wasp, Medusa is the team's primary short-range offense. Eventually the team triumphs over the Beyonder and returns to Earth. At the end of the series, Medusa can be seen alongside Black Bolt attending the funeral of her Beyond! teammate Gravity. She gives Gravity's parents a precious statue, the highest honor amongst the Inhumans, in commemoration of Gravity's sacrifice.

In I Heart Marvel, Medusa stars and narrates in a one-shot vignette appearing in issue #3 of the Marvel Ai edition. Titled Silence of the Heart, the story explores the relationship between Medusa and Black Bolt. Medusa explains that her husband's silence is a burden that she also bears. Black Bolt makes an appearance at this point and the two are shown to make love as Medusa contemplates her longing to hear a moan, whisper, or laugh from him.

The title Son of M focuses on Pietro Maximoff following the events of House of M. After attempting to commit suicide, a dying Pietro is brought to Attilan by Crystal. While Gorgon protests, Medusa grants Pietro asylum in Attilan until he is fully recovered. Once healed, a depowered Pietro tries to convince Black Bolt and Medusa to allow him access to the Terrigen Mists, but Medusa firmly states that Terrigenesis is a process forbidden to outsiders and that such a process upon a human could result in drastic mutations. Pietro manages to expose himself to the Mists regardless, and receives new powers before collecting both the Terrigen Crystals and his daughter, Luna, and returning to Earth. The crystals eventually end up in the possession of a black-ops sector of the United States government. The sector's subsequent refusal to return the crystals sparks a declaration of war between the Inhumans and the United States.

During this title it is made reference that Black Bolt and Medusa are childless. Upon discovery that Luna has been taken to Earth by Pietro, Medusa advises Crystal that perhaps it is right that Pietro should spend time with his daughter. Crystal remarks that if Medusa had children of her own she might be able to understand how she felt over the matter. It is not apparent whether this is an example of Ahura's existence being retconned from the Marvel Universe, or if this is meant to be a sarcastic comment in reference to Ahura's supposed confinement.

The events of Silent War immediately follow the events of Son of M. The Silent War series reveals a growing rift between Medusa and Black Bolt as the two disagree on his decision to declare war against the United States for failing to relinquish the Terrigen Crystals. Medusa finds herself no longer able to interpret her husband's wishes as she used to. While Medusa is issuing Black Bolt's war declarations to the Inhumans council he becomes frustrated and snaps his fingers to silence her, indicating that she wasn't relating what he intended. Medusa later confides to Black Bolt that he had never treated her that way before, as if she were a dog, and Black Bolt responds apologetically.

Their son, Ahura, also reappears in this series as a mentally unstable adolescent. Medusa argues that Black Bolt seems not to care that their son is being kept in isolation, and advises him that despite his orders she has gone to visit Ahura in his cell on more than one occasion. Black Bolt is angered by this and becomes physically aggressive with Medusa, grabbing her face and mouth to silence her. In her growing confusion with her husband's actions, Medusa finds herself drawn to Maximus against her will and would visit him often in his prison cell. It is revealed by Luna, Crystal's daughter, that Maximus had somehow implanted a "darkness" into Medusa's mind that was affecting her actions. Later on, Medusa and Maximus share a kiss as a distraught Black Bolt watches from the shadows. Medusa's thoughts at the time, however, reveal that she is not in control of her actions and that she only loves Black Bolt. The end of Silent War is left a cliffhanger with Black Bolt confined in prison, Ahura released, and Medusa now at Maximus' side as he assumes the throne of the Inhumans.

Due to inconsistencies with other Marvel titles featuring Black Bolt during this time, it is unclear when, and if, Silent War takes place in relation to The Illuminati, World War Hulk, and Secret Invasion storylines.

Medusa appears alongside Black Bolt in issue #1 of the World War Hulk series. Medusa is seen with Black Bolt when Hulk attacks Attilan. She warns Hulk not to pursue a fight with her husband, as Black Bolt has defeated Hulk in past battles. The fight begins and Medusa is not shown to interfere or assist. Black Bolt is subsequently defeated by Hulk, though the battle is not shown beyond Black Bolt's opening attack, and it is made unclear as to how Hulk managed to win the fight.

It was revealed in "New Avengers: Illuminati" that Black Bolt had been replaced by a Skrull impostor for an unknown amount of time. The impostor revealed himself to the Illuminati and was killed. Both the sudden rift between Medusa and Black Bolt apparent in Silent War and Black Bolt's later defeat at the hands of Hulk in World War Hulk could be attributed to this development, for it is uncertain just when Black Bolt might have been replaced by his Skrull duplicate.

When the "Secret Invasion" begins, the Inhumans part of the story, by Heroes writer Joe Pokaski, digs into how the Inhuman Royal Family deals with the news that the Black Bolt they knew was a Skrull impostor. Medusa is shown fighting a Skrull that not only possesses her powers, but also possesses the powers of Mister Fantastic. Medusa heads into Kree space to get Ronan the Accuser to help look for the Skrull ship containing Black Bolt and her son. She succeeds in rescuing her family and returning to Attilan.

During the "War of Kings" storyline, Medusa was with the Inhumans when they went into space and forged an alliance with the Kree and was also there when Havok, Lilandra Neramani, and the rest of Havok's Starjammers requested asylum from Vulcan and his forces. When Maximus speaks out, Medusa pushes him aside. After Ronan is wounded in battle with Vulcan's forces, Medusa states to the Shi'ar that they had made a big mistake and vows that they will pay for this. Medusa does a broadcast on Black Bolt's behalf and tells the citizens of the Kree Empire that they have suffered an unprovoked assault by the forces of the Shi'ar. The shield that once protected their star system has fallen. During a discussion with the other members of the Inhuman Royal Family, Medusa states that Shi'ar blood will spill in the next fight while trying to keep the Kree in line. Medusa and Black Bolt approve of Maximus' idea to create a mechanism to help them in their fight against the Shi'ar. Medusa ends up devastated when the T-Bomb goes off with Black Bolt and Vulcan still where the T-Bomb was. While weeping in Crystal's arms, Medusa declared that they have won.

During the "Dark Reign" storyline, Medusa was seen when Quicksilver appears in Attilan and present them with the Xerogen Crystals following the defeat of Unspoken. Medusa then absolves him of his crimes and restores his citizenship.

During the "Realm of Kings" storyline, Medusa ends up taking control of the Inhumans following Black Bolt's death. Devos the Devastator arrives and ends up inciting a riot in the Alpha Primitives. The Mighty Avengers arrive and help to quell the riots incited by Devos the Devastator. Henry Pym learns from Medusa about what happened to Black Bolt and expresses his sorrow for her loss as he too had lost Wasp. Medusa and the rest of the Inhumans deal with Dr. Vere and Zarek when they plot to overthrow the Inhuman Royal Family.

She takes her husband's place in the Illuminati when Iron Man reassembles the team in response to the Hood's attempts to acquire the Infinity Gems, although in the end Steve Rogers takes 'custody' of Black Bolt's gem at the conclusion of the crisis.

As part of the Marvel NOW! event, Medusa becomes a member of the Future Foundation when the Fantastic Four take a time-traveling trip.

During the "Civil War II" storyline, Medusa and Crystal introduce the Inhuman Ulysses to Captain Marvel, War Machine, and Black Panther. Medusa later catches Iron Man infiltrating New Attilan to claim Ulysses and fails to reason with him. After Iron Man defeats Medusa, Crystal, and Karnak and makes off with Ulysses, Medusa leads some Inhumans to Stark Tower to confront Iron Man which led the Avengers, the Ultimates, S.H.I.E.L.D., and other superheroes to intervene. Medusa was present when Ulysses projected his latest vision of a rampaging Hulk standing over the corpses of the superheroes.

During the "Inhumans vs. X-Men" storyline, Beast overhears Medusa telling the rest of the Inhuman Royal Family that they to be prepared just in case the X-Men lose patience in their truce and attack them. As the X-Men take action against the Inhumans, Medusa sends Iso and Inferno to find out what happened to Black Bolt and Crystal as she prepares for battle. Medusa then fights the time-displaced Beast in the lab of the original Beast as she effectively calls off the truce. As she gets the upper hand, Nightcrawler teleports in and takes her away. Despite the subsequent escalation of the conflict, when Medusa learns that the X-Men only attacked now because the Terrigenesis cloud was about to reach the point where it would make the whole planet toxic to mutants, she resolves the situation by destroying the cloud, preventing any further Inhumans from manifesting their powers, feeling that the future of her species is not worth the present loss of mutant life that would result. She also abdicates her throne to Iso.

In the aftermath, she along with her sister, Crystal, Black Bolt, Flint, Gorgon and Swain, are guided by Noh-Varr to the former Kree throne-world of Hala where he has stated they may discover the origins of Terrigen and in so doing offer a future to their doomed people, however, things are not well for the former Queen as she runs her hand through her powerful hair only to pull a large clump out with it, forcing her to announce to her crew that she is dying. It is soon apparent that Medusa's decision to destroy the Terrigen Cloud is the reason that is afflicting Medusa. She did so to save the Mutant race, but in doing so she had doomed the future of her people. Because Medusa had pressed the button, that act had the consequence of gradually draining the life energies from her. Akin to dying of a broken heart, Medusa had acted to end a cultural heritage that had lasted millennia, and her body has essentially chosen to end with it. Her only hope now is to find the secrets of the Terrigen and bring a new source of it back to their people, so she too can be revitalized. When the Inhumans obtain the Primagen from the Progenitors' World Farm and Gorgon buys his fellow Inhumans time to get away, Maximus takes a sample of the Primagen and has a vision where the Progenitors attack Earth in retaliation for the theft of the Primagen. While on the Astral Plane with Black Bolt, Medusa and Black Bolt agreed to continue as partners and not lovers. When Medusa takes the Primagen, it restores her hair and health while also causing a backlash in the attacking Progenitor to destroy the approaching Progenitors causing the Ordinator-Class Progenitors that saw the attack from the World Farm to spare Earth from their invasion.

During the "Death of the Inhumans" storyline, Medusa is seen with the Inhuman Royal Family when they find the dead bodies of the Universal Inhumans. When an explosive trap starts to go off, Medusa managed to make it out alive. Medusa and the Inhuman Royal Family later mourn the fallen Inhumans following Vox's attack on New Arctilan. After Black Bolt was taken captive by the Kree, Medusa and the surviving Inhuman Royal Family members try to recruit Beta Ray Bill in their fight against Vox and the Kree. The Inhuman Royal Family are finally taking the battle to the Kree and arrive just in time to save Black Bolt from Vox. Medusa is present when it is discovered that Vox is not a Super-Inhuman and is just a Kree programming. When the Inhuman Royal Family and Beta Ray Bill take the battle to the Kree, Medusa and Karnak fight a Vox-controlled Crystal and Lockjaw. After Black Bolt's sonic scream is used on the Vox-controlled Inhumans enough to free Crystal and Lockjaw and cause the Kree to retreat, Medusa is pleased that Crystal and Lockjaw are freed from Vox's control. Black Bolt emerges from the room as Medusa orders Lockjaw to take them away from the Kree base. When Crystal asks where they should go, Black Bolt uses his sign language to say "home." Lockjaw then teleports them away.

Medusa and Black Bolt once again become lovers later on.

Powers and abilities
Medusa possesses a long, thick head of red hair; thanks to her exposure to the mutagenic Terrigen Mist, every strand of her hair has great tensile strength, modulus of elasticity, and sheer resistance far surpassing human hair.

Medusa can control the movement of her hair as if it were countless thin appendages growing from her head. A psionic field permeates her mutagenically altered hair-cells, causing mutual attraction across the gaps between strands. These relatively small forces operate in conjunction to develop larger forces. Through concentration, she can psionically move her hair in any manner imaginable. She can snap the length of it through the air like a whip (the tip of which moves faster than the speed of sound), or rotate it in a fan-like manner. She can bind persons or objects with it as if it were rope, or use it to lift objects which weigh more than she could lift with her arms. Her scalp, skull, and neck do not support the weight of an object that she lifts: It is held aloft by the psionic force coursing through the hair. Medusa can also perform delicate manipulations with her hair such as lock picking or threading a needle, and such complex acts of coordination as typing or shuffling a deck of cards. Although she has no nerve endings in her hair, she can "feel" sensations on all parts of her hair by a form of mental feedback from her psionic field.

Medusa is an accomplished thief, using her hair. Medusa is also able to retain some degree of control over her hair after it has been cut or otherwise severed from her scalp. She presumably has the typical enhanced physical abilities granted by the genetically superior Inhuman physiology. She is also highly skilled at interpreting the gestures and body language of Black Bolt, and is fluent in a special sign language she uses with Black Bolt.

Like all Inhumans, Medusa's immune system is weaker than that of an average human. However, due to her frequent ventures into the outside world, Medusa's immune system is stronger than that of her fellow Inhumans. As such, she has attained a resistance to the pollutants of the outside world, which enabled her to join the Fantastic Four (as well as be a former member of the Frightful Four) in the first place.

Cultural impact and legacy

Critical reception 
Jesse Schedeen of IGN stated, "If any Inhuman rivals Black Bolt in terms of importance, it's his queen, Medusa. Unlike her namesake, Medusa isn't known for having snakelike qualities or turning people to stone. Instead, her hair is her primary weapon. She can control every strand, using it to choke or restrain enemies, or even cut through objects like razor wire. Like Black Bolt, Medusa seems too important a character to not introduce in some form before the Inhumans movie. Unlike her husband, Medusa has a habit of venturing out into the wider world and mingling with humanity. She's even served as a member of the Fantastic Four several times in the comics. Much like Karnak, we could see Medusa appearing in the role of an emissary from Attilan, tasked with exploring the outside world and meeting the growing population of Inhumans. With the growing outcry for more female heroes in the Marvel Cinematic Universe, Marvel could do a lot worse than introducing Medusa well ahead of the Inhumans movie. In many ways, she's become the face of the franchise in the comics now, and the same could happen for the MCU as well." CA Staff of ComicsAlliance asserted, "Like many great characters, Medusa casts an evocative image, with her massive red mane of prehensile hair. Moreso than its king, Attilan's queen is immediately noticeable as a figure of power, and as the voice of the royal family and its matriarch, Medusa at her best is allowed to be a complex figure balancing the responsibilities of power and family. Her time with the Future Foundation deepened her character, showcasing her empathy, balanced with her otherworldly authority and that hair that radiates around her like an aura. A striking figure both in design and character, Medusa is not to be trifled with." Matthew Aguilar of Comicbook.com wrote, "Medusa has become a bigger fixture of the Marvel universe in recent years, thanks to the push the Inhumans have received in the comics. That push is now starting to expand past the comics and into television, as a new series will be debuting on ABC later this year, and Medusa will be front and center. The character has seen the share of unique and eye catching looks over the years. She's gone from the Fantastic Fouresque costume (she was in the Frightful Four after all) to something much more fantasy oriented and a bit of everything in between. Some have worked, some have woefully underdelivered, but she's remained one of the most popular Inhumans despite the changes in appearance." Jackson Brueheim of CBR.com said, "Medusa is without a doubt the most recognizable Marvel character to have prehensile hair. She is well-known as the Queen of the Inhumans and a fierce fighter with equally fierce follicles. She rules her people alongside her husband Black Bolt while sharing a telepathic connection to him. As for her hair, it can double its length when needed and lift objects over 1,000 pounds. Adding in the fact that her immune system is stronger than the average Inhumans', she sets a high standard for other characters with controllable hair."

Trevor Norkey of Screen Rant wrote, "Among the different characters in the Inhumans comics, Medusa is certainly one of the most well known. This Queen of Attilan had a profound effect on all of her people, being one of the most powerful members of the civilization's political spectrum. Much of Medusa's work was done in outreach programs to Earth. After Earth's discovery of Attilan, Medusa dealt with most of the relations between the two civilizations to make sure that there was a mutual respect between the different governments. Medusa's work on Earth combined with her respect in Attilan itself makes her into a truly great Queen. Additionally, her personal power adds to her overall strength. After all, a Queen with magic, crazy powerful hair is certainly not a Queen you would want to mess with. Unfortunately, Medusa is not the most fond of her leadership position. She is only part of the Attilan Royal Family through marriage, and originally had much different plans for her career during her early years. All in all, while Medusa may not be as powerful as Blackbolt, she is still one of the greatest leaders in Attilan, and overall one of the greatest members of royalty in all of Marvel comics." Blair Marnell of Nerdist asserted, "Medusa is best known for her striking red hair, which has incredible tensile strength and the ability to elongate at will, while also giving Medusa the ability to carry herself or heavy objects. Think of the way that Disney used Rapunzel in Tangled, except on a much grander scale. [...] For decades, Medusa and the rest of the Inhumans were better known as supporting characters. But in recent years, Marvel has aggressively pushed the Inhumans in their comic book universe. Consequently, Medusa has emerged as one of Marvel’s top heroines and headlined many of the Inhumans comic book titles as the sole ruler of her people. Medusa has even joined A-Force, the team of all-female Avengers that emerged during the Secret Wars crossover. More recently, Medusa led her followers into war against the mutants during the Inhumans vs. X-Men event series. Now that the Inhuman royal family are finally joining the Marvel Cinematic Universe, Medusa’s profile will inevitably be raised again. It should be interesting to see how Medusa’s signature hair will be rendered on screen." Mark Peters of Salon.com said, "The comic-book grapevine is continually buzzing that Marvel is determined to push the Inhumans as a substitute for the mutants whose movie rights are owned by rival studio Fox. So why not bring in the queen of the Inhumans to build interest? Bonus: Medusa has the most visually exciting hair in comics: her red locks, which can be used as tentacle-like weapons, have enlivened more classic comic-book covers than any other character’s coiffure." Peyton Hinckle of ComicsVerse stated, "Recent comics have tried to separate Medusa and Black Bolt in the hopes of showing each character as an individual instead of as part of a unit. Black Bolt’s solo series, Black Bolt, has fleshed out his character and made him more than just a scary guy who sits on a throne all day. Similarly, the series Royals made Medusa into a character who was more than just the Queen of the Inhumans. The loss of her Inhuman power showed a vulnerable side of Medusa’s character that’s never been seen before. Although modern Inhumans comics have done interesting things with Medusa and Black Bolt as separate characters, the two haven’t had a lot of panel time together."

Accolades 

 In 2015, IGN included Medusa in their "7 Inhumans We Want on Agents of S.H.I.E.L.D." list.
 In 2016, Comicbook.com  included Medusa in their "10 Marvel Women Who Should Come to Disney Infinity 3.0" list.
 In 2016, ComicsAlliance ranked Medusa 3rd in their "Marvel’s Royal Inhumans, Ranked From Worst To Best" list.
 In 2017, Screen Rant ranked Medusa 17th in their "Every Member Of The Fantastic Four, Ranked Worst To Best" list.
 In 2018, CBR.com ranked Medusa 6th in their "20 Most Powerful Inhumans" list.
 In 2018, Paste ranked Medusa 9th in their "20 Members of the Fantastic Four" list.
 In 2018, Screen Rant ranked Medusa 8th in their "15 Most Powerful Kings And Queens In The Marvel Universe" list.
 In 2019, CBR.com ranked Medusa 7th in their "10 Most Powerful Members Of Royalty In Marvel Comics" list and 9th in their "10 Most Powerful Queens In the Marvel Universe" list.
 In 2020, CBR.com ranked Medusa 9th in their "5 Marvel Women Who Should Have Their Own Solo Comic (& 5 Who Already Do)" list.
 In 2021, Screen Rant ranked Medusa 5th in their "Fantastic Four: 10 Best Female Villains" list. and 6th in their "Marvel Comics: 10 Best Alternate Members Of The Fantastic Four" list.
 In 2022, CBR.com ranked Medusa 2nd in their "10 Inhumans Who Should Join The Avengers" list, 7th in their "10 Best Fantastic Four Substitute Members" list, and 12th in their "Every Member Of The Illuminati" list.

Other versions

Earth X
In the alternate future of Earth X, Medusa's hair volume has drastically increased. She has lost Black Bolt and fears the emotional loss of her son, Ahura. She is the acting ruler and Queen of the Inhumans. Many of her remaining friends and allies have mutated due to the incidents on Earth. As a way to tie together some of the powerful factions remaining on Earth, Captain Britain proposes to her. Their story continues into the mini-series Paradise X, where convenience has turned into love. However, the status of their relationship and their political positions is thrown into turmoil when Captain Britain's presumed lost wife Meggan is brought back to life.

Heroes Reborn

In Heroes Reborn, Medusa's home city of Attilan plays host to the Fantastic Four. As in other realities, she speaks for her husband, Black Bolt. The Four are asked to help the Inhumans stop the plans of Maximus the Mad, who seeks out and plans to control the Terrigen Mists. The group at first does not understand the request, which leads to a battle. Medusa proves herself a capable fighter, helping to keep the battle at a stalemate.

In this universe, Galactus is worshipped, and the Royal Council pay reverence to him and his team of heralds in the form of finely crafted statues throughout Attilan.

Marvel 1602

Medusa appears in the Marvel 1602 miniseries: 1602: Fantastick Four as a member of the "Four Who Are Frightful", and the Wizard's lover. She has snakes for hair and must also wear a veil to prevent her gaze from turning men to stone. While her introduction describes her as "Inhuman," Medusa's origins are not mentioned. She appears to be a native French speaker and goes by "Madame" Medusa.

Mutant X

In Mutant X, after the Beyonder/Goblin Queen and the vampire Dracula lay waste to the Earth's heroes in an attempt to conquer the Multiverse, a team of Inhumans, Medusa included, and Eternals attack from above. They battle in the heart of Washington D.C. Dracula easily slays the entire group.

Marvel Zombies 3
In Marvel Zombies 3 #2, Medusa and the Inhuman Royal Family are shown to be zombies. Together, they visit zombie Kingpin to ask for food, which they get. In the next issue, Machine Man blows up and obliterates Medusa's rotting head.

Ultimate Marvel

A version of Medusa appears in the Ultimate Marvel series, first appearing in the Ultimate Fantastic Four issue Annual 1: Inhuman. She is still the queen of the Inhumans and wife to their leader, Black Bolt. As with her namesake, in this universe her skin is green in color, and she has actual snakes for hair. It is not stated whether her newly serpentine hair restricts or enhances her abilities in any way. Along with Crystal, the Inhuman Gorgon is female and also Medusa's sister. Black Bolt's brother, Maximus, does not display any romantic feelings for Medusa in this universe.

Unlike other versions, Ultimate Medusa is against all associations with the Fantastic Four and believes that the Inhumans and humans can never co-mingle in peace. She also exhibits an extreme degree of loyalty towards her people, stating that there can be no greater honor than to put aside one's individual happiness for the welfare of Attilan. Despite these sentiments, she expresses regret over her husband's inability to vocalize his feelings. When Black Bolt does feel the need to safely speak, he vocalizes regret over Crystal's actions.

In other media

Television
Medusa appeared alongside the rest of the Inhumans and later the Frightful Four in The New Fantastic Four. This version is the leader of the Inhumans, and is genuinely evil as opposed to being forced into villainy.
Medusa appeared in the 1981 Spider-Man series, voiced by B.J. Ward. The episode "Under the Wizard's Spell" has her serving the Wizard again due to a collar put on her.
Medusa appeared in four episodes of Fantastic Four, voiced by Iona Morris.
Medusa appears in the Inhuman motion comics, voiced by Lisa Ann Beley.
Medusa appears in the Hulk and the Agents of S.M.A.S.H. episode "Inhuman Nature", voiced by Mary Faber.
Medusa appears in Ultimate Spider-Man, voiced again by Mary Faber and later by Rose McGowan. In the episode "Inhumanity", she and the rest of the Inhuman Royal Family are mind-controlled by Maximus where she is used to declare war on S.H.I.E.L.D. Once Maximus' crown is removed by Spider-Man, Medusa and the rest of the Inhuman Royal Family are freed from his control. In the episode "Agent Web", Medusa accompanied the rest of the Inhuman Royal Family when they confront Spider-Man and Triton outside the abandoned city of Atarog. When Spider-Man begged forgiveness for trespassing while explaining why they did that, Medusa interpreted for Black Bolt stating that they are here to give them a ride back to the Triskelion while thanking them for protecting Atarog.
Medusa appears in Guardians of the Galaxy, voiced by Catherine Taber. In the episode "Blue Crystal Persuasion", she is among the Inhumans affected by a plague that caused crystals to grow on their body. Medusa was freed from her stasis by Star-Lord when Lockjaw brought the Guardians of the Galaxy to Attilan. She helped the Guardians of the Galaxy when Maximus used his mind-control technology on Black Bolt and Ronan the Accuser planned to destroy Attilan. In the episode "Inhuman Touch", Medusa helps the Guardians of the Galaxy when Maximus escapes prison.
Medusa appears in Avengers Assemble, voiced by Catherine Taber in season 3, and Vanessa Marshall in season 5. In the episode "Inhumans Among Us", she appears with Black Bolt, Gorgon, Karnak, and Lockjaw at the time when an Inhuman ship carrying Seeker and the Alpha Primitives crashes into the mountains near Maple Falls. During the Avengers' fight with the Inhumans, Falcon engaged with Medusa. When Inferno hatches from his Terrigen cocoon, the Avengers and the Inhumans work together to stop him. In the episode "The Inhuman Condition", Medusa is among the Inhumans that are captured by Ultron. She is later freed by the Avengers. In the episode "Mists of Attilan", Black Panther and Ms. Marvel visit Attilan to obtain the key fragment that T'Challa's grandfather entrusted to the Inhumans before the Shadow Council does. Medusa and Black Bolt were reluctant until Shadow Council member Princess Zanda is defeated and gets away. After some persuasion from Crystal, Medusa and Black Bolt give the piece to Black Panther as he warns them that the Shadow Council will come after Attilan as well.

Medusa appears in the 2017 live-action Marvel Cinematic Universe (MCU) series Inhumans, portrayed by Serinda Swan. When Maximus usurps the throne, he has Pulsus stun her and Maximus shave off her hair so that she can't fight back. However, she is rescued by Lockjaw who takes her to Hawaii. After an encounter with Auran, Medusa meets Louise Fisher, a scientist who has been curious about the moon and its possible extraterrestrial existence. While with Louise, Medusa displayed a very anti-social personality which appeared to be attributed to her conflicted upbringing. Her parents wanted to destroy the caste system, leaving a cloud of shame above her and Crystal. Together, they manage to locate Black Bolt and make off with Locus, an Inhuman who can locate others of her kind. Later, the group reunites with Karnak and Gorgon, but Locus dies from a previous wound. Before passing, she tells Black Bolt that he is capable of becoming a better king. Medusa, Black Bolt and Louise leave to look for Crystal and Lockjaw. When Black Bolt expresses a desire to kill his brother, Medusa calms him. They find Crystal and Lockjaw and return to Karnak. After Black Bolt reveals that Triton is alive and that they were both aware of Maximus' treachery in advance, Medusa voices her disapproval at being left in the dark. She further reveals that after, Black Bolt accidentally killed his parents, she was going to gloat as revenge for what they did to her mother and father, but fell in love with him instead; expressing that she is more than just Black Bolt's "mouth piece". Medusa tries to appeal to Maximus' good half, but when he refuses to stop the destruction of the dome, she destroys the one Terrigen Crystal. After the city is completely evacuated, Medusa leaves with her family through Lockjaw. Black Bolt joins afterwards as he allows her to speak to the people on her own accord, instead of just translate for him.
Medusa appears in the anime series Marvel Future Avengers, voiced by Hiroko Ushida in Japanese and Erica Lindbeck in English.

Video games
 Medusa appears as a non-playable character in Marvel: Ultimate Alliance, voiced by Nancy Linari. She was brainwashed by Doctor Doom to serve him when she was looking for the Ultimate Nullifier on Muir Island. Medusa was imprisoned at Attilan. She has special dialogue with Invisible Woman.
 Medusa appears as an unlockable character in Marvel: Avengers Alliance.
 Medusa appears as an unlockable character in Marvel Future Fight.
 Medusa appears as an unlockable character in Marvel Avengers Academy, voiced by Amber Lee Connors.
 Medusa appears as a playable character in Lego Marvel Super Heroes 2.
Medusa appears as an unlockable character in Marvel: Contest of Champions.
Medusa appears as a playable character in Marvel Puzzle Quest.
Medusa appears as a non-playable character in Marvel Ultimate Alliance 3: The Black Order, voiced again by Mary Faber.
Medusa appears in the digital collectible card game Marvel Snap.

References

External links
 Medusa at Marvel.com
 The Inhumans at Don Markstein's Toonopedia. Archived from the original on September 17, 2016.
 
 

Characters created by Jack Kirby
Characters created by Stan Lee
Comics characters introduced in 1965
Fantastic Four characters
Fictional characters who can stretch themselves
Fictional characters with superhuman durability or invulnerability
Fictional queens
Fictional whip users
Inhumans
Marvel Comics characters who have mental powers
Marvel Comics characters with superhuman strength
Marvel Comics television characters
Marvel Comics female superheroes